Manyazybash (Manyaźıbaş) is a rural locality (a village) in Kukkuyanovsky Selsoviet, Dyurtyulinsky District, Bashkortostan, Russia. The population was 30 as of 2010. There is 1 street.

Geography 
Manyazybash is located 32 km south of Dyurtyuli (the district's administrative centre) by road. Karazirikovo is the nearest rural locality.

References 

Rural localities in Dyurtyulinsky District